Hardcase is a 2001 novel by American writer Dan Simmons. It is the first of three hardboiled detective novels featuring the character of Joe Kurtz.

References

2001 American novels
Detective novels
Novels by Dan Simmons